Joseph Hawkins (November 14, 1781 - April 20, 1832) was a United States representative from Upstate New York.

A native of Connecticut, Hawkins moved to Henderson, New York in 1810. He completed preparatory studies, studied law, was admitted to the bar and commenced practice in Henderson.  He also engaged in agricultural pursuits.  He served as county judge for many years. Hawkins was  elected as an Anti-Jacksonian to the Twenty-first Congress (March 4, 1829 – March 3, 1831).  He died in Henderson on April 20, 1832, with interment in Clark Cemetery.

References

1781 births
1832 deaths
National Republican Party members of the United States House of Representatives from New York (state)
19th-century American politicians